Redroot is the common name of some plants:

 Ceanothus americanus, aka New Jersey tea, Jersey tea ceanothus, mountain sweet, wild snowball
 Lachnanthes, aka Carolina redroot
 Sanguinaria, aka bloodroot, bloodwort, red puccoon

See also 
 Red-rood, a species of dogwood